Grupo Aereo Monterrey S.A. de C.V., known under the commercial name Magnicharters, is an airline with its headquarters in Colonia Juárez, Cuauhtémoc, Mexico City,  operating domestic holiday flights out of Mexico City International Airport.

History
The travel agency Magnitur was created in 1984. Magnicharters was established in 1994 by the Bojórquez family to fly the clients of Magnitur. It started operations in January 1995. Focusing on the domestic tourism market, it mainly serves the major beach resorts of the country.

Magnicharters was the first Mexican commercial airline to hire a woman pilot.

In 2000, Magnicharters was allowed to offer commercial flights (only charters and cargo flights before).

In 2014, Magnicharters invested $2.5 million to develop its fleet by 30%. That year, the airline started flights to the United States, from Monterrey to Las Vegas and Orlando.

In July 2017, to celebrate the 25 year-anniversary of the Lucha Libre AAA Worldwide, Magnicharters presented 2 planes painted with the masks of Dr. Wagner Jr. and Psycho Clown.

Destinations

Additionally, Magnicharters offers a wide range of charter flights.

Fleet
The Magnicharters fleet consists of the following aircraft (as of November 2022):

The Magnicharters fleet previously included the following aircraft:
 Boeing 737-100
 Boeing 737-200
 Boeing 737-500
 Boeing 727

Accidents and incidents
On 14 September 2007 at 19:29 local time, the landing gear of a Magnicharters Boeing 737-200 (registered XA-MAC) collapsed upon landing at Guadalajara International Airport. The aircraft with 103 passengers and 6 crew members had been on Flight 582 from Cancún. Following the crash, an engine fire broke out, but the aircraft was evacuated in time, so that there were no fatalities.
On 27 April 2009 at approximately at 18:00 local time another undercarriage failure occurred with a Magnicharters Boeing 737-200 (registered XA-MAF) operating a flight from Cancún to Guadalajara, this time as Flight 585. Upon approaching Guadalajara International Airport, the landing gear could not be fully lowered, so the pilots had to perform a belly landing. There were no serious injuries among the 108 passengers and 8 crew on board.
In December 2014, a pilot of the airline was laid off for letting the singer Esmeralda Ugalde sit in the pilot's seat and take possession of the plane's control during a commercial flight. The singer had taken photos and posted them on Twitter.
In December 2014, the PROFECO suspended the commercial activity of Magnicharters because the company did not release its prices to the public.
On 26 November 2015 another landing gear problem on a Boeing 737-300  occurred and caused the left main leg to fail and sway the aircraft, but without any injuries. A photo labelled "MEXICO AIRPORT FIRE DEPT" shows the left main gear leg displaced to the rear, with a broken wing root fairing.  This points out not to a folded LG, but a structural failure.

References

External links

Official website 

Airlines of Mexico
Charter airlines of Mexico
Airlines established in 1994
Mexican companies established in 1994